Jonathan Creek is a tributary of the Petitcodiac River in New Brunswick. The creek's watershed area is around 50 km2. The majority of Jonathan Creek flows through the city of Moncton, eventually joining Jones Lake.  Because of its close proximity to commercial and residential areas, water run off and bank erosion have impacted the condition of Jonathan Creek.  In 2003, city of Moncton pleaded guilty to environmental charges regarding leachate from an out of service landfill being found in Jonathan Creek.

See also
 List of rivers of New Brunswick

References

External links
 https://web.archive.org/web/20120308231933/http://www.petitcodiacwatershed.org/jonathan_creek
 https://web.archive.org/web/20131228065401/http://www.bassinpetitcodiac.org/jonathan_creek_restoration
 http://ebi.probeinternational.org/investigations/news-coverage-2/april-19-2007-2/

Rivers of New Brunswick
Moncton